Bhokar Assembly constituency is one of the 288 Vidhan Sabha (legislative assembly) constituencies of Maharashtra state in Western India. This constituency is located in Nanded district.

Members of Legislative Assembly

Election results

General elections 2009
Before 2009 Assembly election Ashok Chavan takes charge as  Chief Minister of Maharashtra in November 2008.

 
 

After Assembly election-2009, MLA of Bhokar Mr.Ashok Chavan becomes Chief Minister of Maharashtra.

General elections 2014

General elections 2019

 

Former Chief Minister Ashok Chavan won this seat with a record margin.

See also
 Bhokar
 List of constituencies of Maharashtra Vidhan Sabha

Notes

Assembly constituencies of Maharashtra
Politics of Nanded district